Spanish American War Monument to the 71st Infantry Regiment is a historic war memorial located in Mount Hope Cemetery at Greenburgh, Westchester County, New York. It was built in 1901 at the 71st Infantry Regiment burial plot, and is an 18 feet square and 18 feet high, Quincy granite structure in the Neoclassical style.  It has granite steps, wrought and cast iron double entrance doors, and a square cupola.  A second set of steps was built in 1905.

It was added to the National Register of Historic Places in 2011.

See also
National Register of Historic Places listings in southern Westchester County, New York

References

External links
Mount Hope Cemetery website

Monuments and memorials on the National Register of Historic Places in New York (state)
Buildings and structures completed in 1901
Neoclassical architecture in New York (state)
Buildings and structures in Westchester County, New York
Spanish–American War memorials in the United States
Greenburgh, New York
National Register of Historic Places in Westchester County, New York
1901 establishments in New York (state)